Solarflesh – A Gospel of Radiant Divinity is the eighth studio album by the Polish death metal band Hate. The follow-up to 2010's "Erebos" was recorded at Sound Division Studio in Warsaw with Filip "Heinrich" Hałucha (Vesania, Decapitated) and Arek "Malta" Malczewski (Behemoth's sound engineer). The CD was mixed at Hertz Studio in Bialystok, Poland with producers Wiesławscy Brothers.

Track list

Reception

The album received mixed to positive reviews. Writing for Revolver Magazine, Greg Pratt said that on Solarflesh, Hate "nailed the best of modern no-frills death metal" and that "With a production that’s pristine but not overdone, this album is the moment Hate have been working towards all these years", giving the album a 4/5. Madam X's review on Angry Metal Guy was more critical of the album, giving it 2.5/5 and concluding that "I’m hoping Solarflesh ends up being a grower. ATF Sinner’s vocal style is just as big, hostile and euphorically brutal now as back in 2010, and once cranked up full-ball, I already enjoy Solarflesh more than I did the first few times I spun it. Right now though, I don’t find the album that different to what Hate (and their Polish counterparts) have put out before and added to that the watered down sound there’s nothing driving me to pick Solarflesh over Hate’s Erebos masterpiece." Metal Hammer gave the album a positive review, awarding it 7/10 and writing that "They sound particularly sinister this time out, and the flavour suits them."

Personnel
Personnel adapted from Allmusic.

References 

2013 albums
Napalm Records albums